WDOG (1460 AM) was an ESPN Radio branded sports radio station in Barnwell, South Carolina, United States. ESPN Radio broadcast at 1460 kHz, on the AM dial.

WDOG had Clemson Tigers football coverage, while WDOG-FM has South Carolina Gamecocks football coverage during the college football season. WDOG-FM also carries Gamecock basketball and baseball games during the respective seasons.

WDOG's license was surrendered to the Federal Communications Commission on June 9, 2022, and cancelled on June 13.

External links

FCC Station Search Details: DWDOG (Facility ID: 24621)
FCC History Cards for WDOG (covering 1964-1981)

DOG
Radio stations established in 1966
1966 establishments in South Carolina
Radio stations disestablished in 2022
2022 disestablishments in South Carolina
Defunct radio stations in the United States
DOG